Wolfgang Amadeus Mozart's Horn Concerto No. 3 in E-flat major, K. 447, was completed between 1784 and 1787, during the Vienna Period.

Background 
The composition was written as a friendly gesture for the hornist Joseph Leutgeb (his name is mentioned a few times in the score), and Mozart probably did not consider it as particularly important, since he failed to enter it to the autograph catalogue of his works.
The autograph score remained well preserved; it is stored in the British Library in London.

Instrumentation 
In addition to the solo horn (in E), the concerto is scored for 2 clarinets in B (unlike the oboes used in the other horn concertos), 2 bassoons, and strings.

Form 
The work is in 3 movements:
 Allegro (4/4)
 Romance (Larghetto) (4/4)
 Allegro (6/8)

This concerto "has clarinets besides bassoons and string for accompaniment. They bring warmth and light colouring to this most attractive work, and in spite of unadventurous support they partner the bassoons in many typical phrases."

The main melody of the third movement is reminiscent of the theme from the rondo of Mozart's Piano Concerto No. 22 written in 1785.

Discography
Given its duration (about 15 minutes), the Concerto is typically grouped with Mozart's other three for the instrument, in boxed sets of Mozart's concerti for wind instruments or even all his concerti.

One example is Dennis Brain's November, 1953 recording of the four horn concertos on EMI with The Philharmonia Orchestra conducted by Herbert von Karajan.

The Naxos Records CD "Complete Works for Horn & Orchestra" includes, besides the concerti, three rondos for horn and orchestra completed by musicologists.

William Purvis has recorded No. 3 along with No. 2, K. 417, with the Orpheus Chamber Orchestra for Deutsche Grammophon, on a disc which also includes Mozart's Oboe Concerto, K. 314 and Bassoon Concerto, K. 191. Like the other two soloists, Purvis improvised his own cadenza for the two horn concerti on the disc.

Fred Rizner has recorded this concerto together with K. 495 with the English Chamber Orchestra conducted by José Luis García Asensio on a Summit disc which also includes the Clarinet Concerto, K. 622 (with clarinetist Joaquin Valdepeñas).
 2018: Javier Bonet (horn); Munich Radio Orchestra, Hermann Baumann (conductor), ARSIS. A recording with all the Mozart horn Concertos including the Rondó KV 371 and the Horn quintet KV 407

References

 Mozart, W. A.; Giegling (preface) (2003). Konzert in Es für Horn und Orchester, Nr.3. K 447 Klavierauszug (Piano Reduction). Germany: Bärenreiter-Verlag. pg II. ISMN M-2018-0703-4

External links
 
 

Horn concertos by Wolfgang Amadeus Mozart
Stefan Zweig Collection
Compositions in E-flat major
1787 compositions